Clube Atlético Taquaritinga, commonly known as Taquaritinga, is a Brazilian football club based in Taquaritinga, São Paulo state. It competes in the Campeonato Paulista Segunda Divisão, the fourth tier of the São Paulo state football league.

History
The club was founded on March 17, 1942. Taquaritinga was awarded the Troféu dos Invictos in 1957 by A Gazeta Esportiva newspaper after 20 games without losing. They won the Campeonato Paulista Série A3 in 1964, Campeonato Paulista Série A2 in 1982 and in 1992, and the Campeonato Paulista Segunda Divisão in 1997.

Achievements

 Campeonato Paulista Série A2:
 Winners (2): 1982, 1992
 Campeonato Paulista Série A3:
 Winners (1): 1964
 Campeonato Paulista Segunda Divisão:
 Winners (1): 1997

Stadium

Clube Atlético Taquaritinga play their home games at Estádio Municipal Adail Nunes da Silva, nicknamed Taquarão. The stadium has a maximum capacity of 18,805 people.

References

 
Football clubs in São Paulo (state)
Association football clubs established in 1942
1942 establishments in Brazil